This is a list of members of the Flemish Parliament in its 12th legislative term, arranged alphabetically. The legislative term started in 2009 (after the Belgian regional elections of 2009) and lasted until 2014. However, it is only the fourth legislature since the members of the Flemish Parliament were first elected.

Results

Leadership

Bureau
This is a list of the current members of the Bureau of the Flemish Parliament.

Speakers

Secretaries

Floor leaders
This is a list of the current floor leaders of the recognised fractions. They form the Extended Bureau together with the members of the Bureau.

List of current representatives

† Elected as member of Vlaams Belang; joined the New Flemish Alliance (N-VA) on 31 August 2011.
‡ Elected as members of Vlaams Belang; became independent representatives on 20 July 2011 (Ackers) and 12 July 2012 (Van Steenberge).

Changes during the legislature

Representatives who chose not to sit

Representatives who resigned

Sources
 
 

2009
2009 in Belgium
2010s in Belgium